Senator Dollinger may refer to:

Isidore Dollinger (1903–2000), New York State Senate
Richard A. Dollinger (born 1951), New York State Senate